10.or, often pronounced Tenor, is a mobile brand launched by Chinese company Huaqin Technology, which was founded in 2005. The brand was launched in India exclusively available on Amazon India.

In 2017, the company made a debut in India with 10.or E smartphone, which is sold exclusively on Amazon India. The brand made numerous subsequent product launches.

Products
Prior to 2018, three models were launched. The debuted in India in 2017 with the model 10.or E in two variants. It became a hit among younger generations and was viewed as a low budget phone with some good features. In August 2018, the 10.or D2 phone was launched. After almost a year, the company launched its latest phone, the 10.or G2, in July 2019. Two variants with 4GB and 6GB RAM were also released.

10.or models include:
 10.or D 
 10.or E (with two variants)
 10.or G
 10.or D2
 10.or G2

References

External links
 Official website
 10.or on Facebook
10.or on Twitter
10.or on Instagram
10.or on YouTube

Mobile phone manufacturers
Mobile phone companies of China
Companies based in Shanghai
Chinese companies established in 2005
Chinese brands
Electronics companies established in 2005